The 1972 NCAA University Division Outdoor Track and Field Championships were contested June 1−3 at the 50th annual NCAA-sanctioned track meet to determine the individual and team national champions of men's collegiate University Division outdoor track and field events in the United States. 

This year's outdoor meet was hosted by the University of Oregon at Hayward Field in Eugene, OR. 

UCLA easily finished atop the team standings, capturing their second consecutive, and fourth overall, team national title.

Team result 
 Note: Top 10 only
 (H) = Hosts

References

NCAA Men's Outdoor Track and Field Championship
NCAA University Division Track and Field Championships
NCAA
NCAA University Division Track and Field Championships